Pristimantis fenestratus is a species of frog in the family Strabomantidae. It is found in the Amazon Basin of eastern Peru, north-eastern Bolivia, south-eastern Ecuador, south-eastern Colombia, and Brazil. Its common name is Rio Mamore robber frog, after Mamoré River, its type locality.
Its natural habitats are tropical humid montane and lowland forests; it can also occur in secondary forest and forest edges. It is very common in parts of its range.

References

fenestratus
Amphibians of Bolivia
Amphibians of Brazil
Amphibians of Colombia
Amphibians of Ecuador
Amphibians of Peru
Amphibians described in 1864
Taxonomy articles created by Polbot